The Mexico national Baseball5 team represents Mexico in international Baseball5 competitions.

History
Mexico qualified as hosts of the inaugural Baseball5 World Cup, where they finished fifth with a 4–4 record. The team participated in the historic first game of tournament, defeating Lithuania 5–3 and 4–2.

Current roster

Staff

Tournament record

Baseball5 World Cup

References

National baseball5 teams
Baseball5